The Cuban fruit-eating bat (Brachyphylla nana) is a species of bat in the family Phyllostomidae found in the Cayman Islands, Cuba, and Hispaniola (both the Dominican Republic and Haiti).It has been extirpated from the Bahamas and Jamaica.

References

Phyllostomidae
Mammals described in 1902
Mammals of the Dominican Republic
Mammals of Haiti
Mammals of Cuba
Taxonomy articles created by Polbot
Taxa named by Gerrit Smith Miller Jr.
Bats of the Caribbean